Stephen Egerton may refer to:
Stephen Egerton (priest) (1555?–1621?), English clergyman
Stephen Egerton (diplomat) (1932–2006), British Ambassador to Iraq, Saudi Arabia and Italy
Stephen Egerton (guitarist) (born 1964), American guitarist